CRDB Bank Plc is a commercial bank in Tanzania. It is licensed by the Bank of Tanzania, the central bank and national banking regulator. As of 31 December. 2018, the bank was reporting Total Assets of TSh 8 billion and Total Deposits of TSh 6 billion.

Background
CRDB Bank Plc is the largest, wholly owned private universal bank in Tanzania. The Bank was established in 1996 as a result of the Tanzanian Government privatization of state-owned firms. The major shareholders of the Bank are Denmark Government-sponsored fund and leading Tanzania pension funds.

The bank listed on the Dar es Salaam Stock Exchange in 2009 and as of December 2019, there are over 30,000 shareholders of the bank.

Location
The headquarters is located at Palm Beach, Upanga East, Ally Hassan Mwinyi Road in Dar es Salaam, the financial capital and largest city in Tanzania. The geographical coordinates of the bank's headquarters at Latitude:-6.799562, Longitude:39.28344.

Ownership
CRDB Bank is a publicly listed company on the Dar es Salaam stock exchange owned by individuals, private and  government institutions as per the following shareholding structure;

The total number of shareholders by the end of 2019 stood at 30,023.

Structure and Operating Network 
CRDB Bank as a group comprises three subsidiaries namely CRDB Microfinance Ltd that deals with Microfinance business, CRDB Insurance broker that offers a range of insurance services and/or products and the CRDB Bank Burundi Ltd, which is the first overseas subsidiary in the neighboring country of Burundi a part of the Regional Expansion plan in East Africa.

Internally, CRDB Bank has 234 branches, 535 ATMs (spread across the country), 15 Mobile branches, 490 Microfinance partners’ institutions, over 8,000 CRDB Wakala, over 1,500 merchants with sales terminals (PoS), internet and mobile banking facilities.

Financial Strength 

The Bank has been selected a friendly partner by various international financial institutions, including the International Financial Corporation (IFC), KFW-DEG, Germany, CDC-UK and African Development Bank. In 2016, CRDB Bank became the first bank in Tanzania to be rated among the top ten stable and safe to invest African banks by the global financial rating agency Moody's Investors Services. Moody's rated CRDB Bank with a "B1 stable outlook"  -- the highest rating to have been acquired by banks or financial institutions in sub Saharan Africa.

CRDB Bank's 2018 balance sheet reports Total Assets of TSh 6 trillion and Total Deposits of TSh 4.7 trillion as at 31 December 2018.  The bank has approximately 3,100 employees, and offers major financial investment dealings in Tanzania and Burundi.

See also

 List of banks in Tanzania
 Microfinance in Tanzania

References

Banks of Tanzania
Economy of Dar es Salaam
Companies listed on the Dar es Salaam Stock Exchange
Banks established in 1996
1996 establishments in Tanzania
Tanzanian brands